Haddadus aramunha is a species of frog in the family Craugastoridae.
It is endemic to Bahia, Brazil, on Serra do Sincorá, at 942 to 1,207 meters above sea level.
Its natural habitat is high altitude rocky open grasslands.

References

Haddadus
Endemic fauna of Brazil
Amphibians of Brazil
Amphibians described in 2008